Law Point is a 2014 Indian Malayalam-language drama thriller film written by Devadas and directed by Lijin Jose. It stars Kunchacko Boban as an advocate and Namitha Pramod as a modern, city bred girl.

Plot 

Sathya Mohan is a leading criminal advocate after he successfully wins a rape case against the victim Sainnaba. He is now consulted to handle a compromising situation regarding the suicide attempt of Maya. Dealing with her father and here Sathya came to the conclusion that Maya is very bold and intelligent and it is not very easy to convince her and her father. He keeps calm and requests her father to take her for a long drive with him. Sathya tells Maya all sorts of lies about his past and it is then revealed at the end, the whole play was well planned, fooling Sathya.

Cast
 Kunchacko Boban as Adv. Sathya Mohan
 Namitha Pramod as Maya
 Joy Mathew as Jayakumar, Maya's Dad
 Nedumudi Venu as Ramakrishnan
 Riya Saira as Sara
 K. P. A. C. Lalitha as Thressia
 P. Balachandran as Charlie
 Suraj Venjaramoodu as Kurian Joseph
 Kalabhavan Prajod as Mahesh, Sathya's Junior
 Devan as Mohan, Sathya's Father
 Mukundan Palat as Public Prosecutor Govindan
Praveena as Geetha (Doctor/House Servant)
 Shari as Umadevi, Sathya's Mother
 Thesni Khan
Krishna Shankar as Abhay
Master Dhananjay as young Sathya
Janaki

References

External links
 

2014 films
2010s Malayalam-language films
2010s crime thriller films
2014 directorial debut films